Salah el-Jayli Mohamed Abu-Qroon (1937 – 15 September 2019) was a Sudanese singer, composer and actor known as Salah ibn Al Badiya or Albadya or el-Badya.

Early life 
Born in Umm Dawm, Khartoum, in 1937 and grew up between Umm Dawm and Abu Qaroun. He was known as Al Badiya because of his relationship with the Baadiyah, or the desert. ibn Albadya started his education at Madrasa before attending regular school.

Artistic career 

ibn Al Badiya was introduced to music through Madih nabawi, until he stumbled on Umm Kulthum, who – with her voice – opened his eyes to a different kind of music. ibn Al Badiya started his career when he was still a teenager but did not make a public appearance until 1959 due to his conservative family's reaction. He was encouraged by journalists Mahjoub Osman and Mahjoub Mohamed Salah. However, his father recognised his voice on the radio and forced him (or he chose) to change his name so as not to bring shame to the family name, el-Jayli, a well-known Sofi leader.

ibn Al Badiya teamed up with poet Mohamed Yousif Mousa and Abu Amna Hamid to produce some of his best songs. ibn Albdaya's discography includes 117 songs in 5 albums, 4 EPs, movies and plays. His career spanned over six decades, and he introduced other prolific artists such as Mahmoud Abdulaziz. Due to his conservative upbringing, ibn Al Badiya's discography also includes Madih nabawi.

His audience extended beyond Sudan, reaching Ethiopia, Chad, Nigeria, Qatar, Kuwait, etc. According to Riek Machar, SPLA had plans to attack a steamer on the White Nile, but when they found out that Salah was on board, they abandoned the idea out of love for the artist.ibn Al Badiya started acting at the theatre with actress Nemat Hmad in Greeba Mosodna and for the crown before starting in Tajouje (a historical romantic tragedy). ibn Al Badiya then moved to the cinema, with his first role being in the movie adaption of Tajouje in 1977, Toar Aljar in Germany, and followed by Eyes Journey (1983).

Death 
ibn Al Badiya died, due to a heart attack, on the 16th of September in 2019, in Amman, Jordan, aged 82. He was there to rest and meet his brother after his final performance during the "Joy of Sudan" concert on the 18th of August, where he sang Oh! My country before the signing to the formation of the civil and military council in Sudan. Thousands, including political leaders, attended his funeral at Umm Dawm.

See also 

 Music of Sudan
 Mostafa Sid Ahmed
 List of Sudanese singers

Further reading 

 Documentary series of posts in Arabic.

References

External links 
 Facebook page

1937 births
2019 deaths
21st-century Sudanese male actors
20th-century Sudanese male actors
Sudanese composers
Sudanese singers
Sudanese culture
People from Khartoum